The 2010 Savannah State Tigers football team represented Savannah State University in American football. The Tigers were members of the NCAA Division I Football Championship Subdivision as a first year member of the Mid-Eastern Athletic Conference (MEAC).

The Tigers entered the 2010 season seeking its first winning season since joining Division I-AA in 2000. The Tigers ended the season with a 1–10 record. The Tigers last winning season was in 1998 as a member of the NCAA Division II.

Season notes

Preseason notes

Head coach Robert "Robby" Wells announced the release of defensive line coach Allen Edwards. Edwards had coached SSU's defensive line since 2008.
Robert "Robby" Wells resigns as head coach of the football team citing personal reasons. Defensive coordinator and defensive backs coach Julius Dixon is announced as interim head football coach.
Thirteen players signed letters of intent to attend Savannah State University on February 3, 2010.

SSU sports information director Opio Mashariki confirmed on February 10, 2010 that assistant coach Jose Gonzalez resigned as linebackers coach on January 3, 2010.
Spring practice was held between March 8 and April 12, 2010.  During the first practice session 13 ineligible players and 20 players who quit the team or were dismissed did not participate.
SSU announced on April 5 that it is moving its spring game to Sunday, April 11 at 2 p.m. at T.A. Wright Stadium. The game was originally scheduled to occur on April 10 at T.A. Wright Stadium.
The Orange team defeated the Blue team, 18–6, in the annual Orange-Blue football scrimmage at T. A. Wright Stadium on April 11. Kicker Derek Williams kicked four field goals in the game for the Orange team. Vince Cochran returned a A.J. DeFillippis pass 49 yards for a touchdown for the Blue team. DeFillippis threw a 12-yard touchdown pass to Alakan Thomas but the extra point attempt was no good.
Savannah State announced that camp would begin on August 5 with the first practice on August 7.
Interim head coach Julius Dixon announced the hiring of Carl Funderburk, Corey McCloud and Dwayne Curry as assistant coaches.
The Tigers 2009 wide receiver coach, Hans Batichon, left the coaching staff, after only one season.
The team's second and final scrimmage of the preseason was held on August 25, 2010, at the SSU practice field. Junior quarterback A.J. DeFilippis threw two touchdown passes and ran for a touchdown to lead the Blue (offense) to a 34–0 victory over the Orange (defense).
Justin Babb, Demetrius Edwards, LaDarien Redfield and Derek Williams were named to the Phil Steele Magazine 2010 Preseason All-Independent Football Team.
Channing Welch, Demetrius Edwards, Justin Babb, and LaDarien Redfield were announced as team captains for the 2010 season.

Regular season notes and standings

Schedule

Coaches and support staff

Roster

{| class="toccolours" style="border-collapse: collapse; font-size:90%;"
|-
|colspan="7" align="center"|2010 Savannah State Tigers by position 
|-
|valign="top"|

Quarterbacks
13 Antonio Bostic – Freshman
14 Alfred Defilippis – Junior
16 Avery Cheeks – Freshman
17 Jake Durham – Freshman
19 Anthony Prophet – Freshman

Running Backs
20 Justin Babb – Senior
21 Sheldon Barnes – Freshman
34 Daniel Heslop – Sophomore
36 John Williams – Freshman
40 Thomas Beaurem – Sophomore
47 Brandon Best – Junior
48 Malachi Youngblood – Junior

Wide Receivers
8 Simon Heyward – Freshman
9 JaQuan Trammel – Freshman
24 Antonio Proctor – Freshman
26 Josh Coleman – Freshman
43 Carnell Weston – Freshman
80 Eric Washington Freshman
81 Dylan Cook – Freshman
82 Stefon Taylor – Senior
83 Nathan Robinson – Junior
84 Alakan Thomas – Junior
85 Bryan Lackey – Freshman
88 Trent Demeritte – Freshman

Tight Ends
5 Patrick McCrary – Freshman
42 Lucas "Chris" Grile – Junior
89 Chryston Floyd – Freshman
91 Terrence Williams – Sophomore
|width="33"| 
|valign="top"|

Kickers / Punters
99 Derek Williams – Sophomore

Offensive Line
52 Terrence Williams – Sophomore
59 Bryce Bell – Freshman
62 Jared Brunson – Junior
68 Thelmore Jackson – Sophomore
70 Demetrius Edwards – Junior
71 Lenworth McKenzie – Sophomore
72 Darryl Harris – Freshman
73 Cedric Brown – Freshman
74 Jonathan Clowers  – Freshman
75 Warren Mason – Sophomore
76 Dan Johnson – Senior
77 Joseph Caldwell-Jones – Freshman
78 Terrick Ransom – Sophomore79 David Larmond – FreshmanDefensive Line
46 Reginald Givens – Junior50 LaDarien Redfield – Junior55 Xavier Lewis – Sophomore57 Denzell Carter – Freshman67 Stephan Myers – Sophomore86 James Briscoe – Sophomore90 Chris McMullen – Sophomore93 Alex Wierzibicki – Freshman94 Channing Welch – Senior	
95 Eric Baker – Sophomore96 Timothy Wright – Sophomore97 Tametric Hunt – Junior|width="33"| 
|valign="top"|

Linebackers
12 Leland Russell – Sophomore31 Rashaud Ferrell – Linebacker32 Taylor Thompson – Freshman35 Sadrak JeanBaptiste – Sophomore41 Broderic Sellers – Freshman44 Darvean Herron – Freshman 45 J. Vince Cochran – Senior49 Michael Kuku – Junior52 Edwin Stevenson – Sophomore53 Nate Clay – Junior54 Dustin Russell – SophomoreDefensive Backs
3 Cedric Chambers – Freshman7 Darren Hunter – Senior8 Patrick Thomas – Sophomore10 Justin Cooper – Sophomore11 Antonio Martin – Sophomore15 Deshawn Printup – Freshman18 Calvert Smith – Sophomore22 Richie Rucker – Junior23 Anthony Welch – Freshman25 Oscar Sims – Freshman27 Mathew Smith – Junior28 Jevonte Miller- Freshman29 Malcome Poindexter – Freshman30 Chris Asbury – Junior33 Khevin Sullivan – Sophomore	
37 Kyle Ashford – Freshman38 Lee Green – Sophomore|}

Game summaries
Georgia Southern
The Tigers were held to 172 total yards of offense by the Eagles defenses en route to a 48–3 loss. Justin Babb led the Tigers offense with 70 yards rushing and three catches for 34 yards. Brian Lackey caught three passes for 37 total yards. Quarterback A.J. DeFilippis finished the game with 7 completions on 19 passes for 71 yards, but was rushed for −18 yards  on the ground and was sacked three times by the Eagles. Redshirt freshman quarterback Antonio Bostick finished 1-of-4 passing for nine yards. The Tigers' defense was led by J. Vince Cochran with 13 tackles and Darren Hunter who added 12 tackles. On special teams, junior kicker Derek Williams hit a 31-yard field goal in the third quarter, but his 43-yard attempt with 3:19 to play in the game struck the right upright. He punted eight times for 267 yards (a 33.4-yard average), with 52 yards as his longest punt in the game. He averaged 64.5-yards with his two kickoffs (129 yards).

The Eagles scored on their first five possessions of the game and ended with 540 yards on offense.

Fort Valley StateMusic City ClassicThe Tigers took a 10–0 lead in the first quarter, but Fort Valley State scored 41 unanswered to beat Savannah State 41–10 in the Music City Classic. A crowd of 4,182 at Macon's Henderson Stadium watched as a 21-yard interception return for a touchdown by Cedric Chambers (4:18 into the game) and a 43-yard Derek Williams field goal gave the Tigers an early lead. However, the Tiger's offense continued to struggle only gaining 131 yards (60 yards rushing and 71 yards passing) with 3 interceptions and 2 lost fumbles on the day. The Tigers defense gave up 345 yards (143 yards rushing and 202 yards passing)

Domin Patterson returned two interceptions for touchdowns of 48 and 44 yards for the Wildcats.

Bethune-Cookman
Bethune-Cookman quarterback Matt Johnson threw two touchdowns and ran for three touchdowns as the Wildcats beat Savannah State 42–7. The win was the 11th straight victory over the Tigers for Bethune Cookman and dropped the Tigers to 0–3 on the season. The Tigers only score came after a 17 play, 75-yard drive in 17 plays when running back Justin Babb scored on a 1-yard touchdown run late in the first quarter. Babb finished the game with 125 yards on 16 carries.
The Tigers offense could only generate four first downs and 100 total yards in the second half of the game. SSU quarterback AJ DeFilippis threw for 59 yards, but had two interceptions for SSU. Quarterback Antonio Bostic threw for 16 yards completing 4 of 4 passes and ran for 19 yards.

Albany StateRumble in the Swamp''
The Rams of Albany State University defeated the Tigers, 28–14, in the inaugural Rumble in the Swamp Classic at Memorial Stadium in Waycross, Georgia. A crowd of 9,273 fans watched as the 16th ranked Rams. Freshman receiver Simon Heyward caught 10 passes in the game for 104 yards. Chris Asbury and J. Vince Cochran each had 11 tackles to lead the defense.

Liberty
The 25th ranked Flames of Liberty University defeated the Tigers 52–14 before a crowd of 19,314 at Williams Stadium in Lynchburg, Virginia. Antonio Bostic passed for 187 yards and 1 touchdown (a 32-yard pass to Brian Lackey). The Tigers only other score was a 22 yards return of a blocked punt by Rashaud Ferrell. Sheldon Barnes ran for 76 and Lackey caught 5 passes for 104 yards to lead the Tigers offense. Darren Hunter led the SSU defense with 11 tackles in the game.

Georgia State
A Georgia Dome crowd of 14,908 fans watched as the Georgia State Panthers defeated the Tigers 55–21. SSU's Sheldon Barnes ran for 78 yards and quarterback Antonio Bostic passed for 95 yards. Simon Heyward was the leading receiver for the Tigers with six catches for 31 yards. Vince Coleman led the Tigers defense with eight tackles.

Florida A&M
Sheldon Barnes ran for 109 yards, but the Tigers were unable to score in a 31–0 loss to the Rattlers of FAMU. The Tigers defense held FAMU scoreless in the first quarter and the Rattlers held a 10–0 at lead at halftime, but the Tiger defense gave up three touchdowns in the second half. Starting quarterback Antonio Bostick threw for only 36 yards with Brian Lackey and Simon Heyward each catching three passes for 18 yards each. The loss kept the Tigers winless (0–7) and was the first shutout of the season.

Alabama State
The Tigers suffered their eighth loss of the season and second straight shutout in a 24–0 loss to Alabama State. The Tigers trailed at halftime, 7–0, but gave up a touchdown in the third quarter and 10 points in the fourth quarter including a 59-yard interception touchdown return. Redshirt freshman quarterback Antonio Bostick passed for 92 yards and freshman wide receiver Simon Heyward caught 8 passes for 63 yards.  Sheldon Barnes rushed for 80 yards. On defense, CJ Smith made a career-high 11 tackles in the game.

Old Dominion
The Monarchs of Old Dominion University scored early and often en route to a 57–9 win over the Tigers in Norfolk, Virginia. The Monarchs scored 21 points in the first quarter and lead 50–9 at halftime. Quarterback Antonio Bostick scored on a one-yard touchdown run with 39 seconds left in the first half for the Tigers only touchdown of the game. Bostick threw for 127 total yards in the game, but was sacked four times by the Monarch's defense and threw one interception that was returned for a touchdown. Darren Hunter led the Tiger's defense with nine tackles.

North Carolina Central
The Tigers ended their losing streak at 11 games by defeating the Eagles of North Carolina Central at Memorial Stadium.  A crowd of 3,518 for the team's first victory this season.  Running back Sheldon Barnes rushed for a career-high 120 yards. Redshirt freshman quarterback Antonio Bostick passed for 78 yards and one touchdown while sophomore quarterback AJ DeFilippis threw for 43 yards and one touchdown. On defense for the Tigers, Michael Kuku had 10 tackles and recovered a fumble.

Norfolk State
The Tigers ended the 2010 season at home with a loss to the Spartans of Norfolk State University. The 4,967 fans at Memorial Stadium saw the Spartans rolled up 579 yards of offense, including 233 yards and three touchdowns by De Angelo Branche, during the game. SSU's only point in the game were scored on two field goals of 47 and 35 yards by kicker Derek Williams. Quarterback Antonio Bostick threw for 54 yards and Antonio Proctor rushed for 68 yards to lead the Tigers offense. Broderick Sellars led the Tigers defense with 16 tackles.

Statistics
Current as of  – All Games

Team

Scores by quarter

Media
Radio flagship: WHCJ
Broadcasters: Steve Richards (play-by-play), Curtis Foster (analyst)

References

Savannah State
Savannah State Tigers football seasons
Savannah State Tigers football